Big Bill is a nickname.

Big Bill may also refer to:

"Big Bill", a song by Johnny Greenwood from the 1975 album The Singing Transport Man
Big Bill, the nickname of the South African Class 15C 4-8-2 locomotives
Big Bill (pig), a world-record pig
Big Bill Creek, in Montana, U.S.
Big Bill Mountain, in Montana, U.S.

See also

Little Bill (disambiguation)
Muddy Waters Sings "Big Bill", a 1960 album